Phillip Anthony Neale  (born 5 June 1954) is an English former first-class cricketer who played for Worcestershire County Cricket Club, captaining the team to success in the County Championship in 1988 and 1989. He also played association football for Lincoln City, Scunthorpe United, Worcester City and Gloucester City. From 2000 to 2020 he worked as Operations Manager for the England cricket team.

Neale was a right-handed middle order batsman who scored more than 900 runs in his first full season of first-class cricket for Worcestershire in 1976, and was then a fixture in the side for the next 15 seasons, scoring 1,000 runs in a season eight times and exceeding 900 in five others. His sole representative appearance was for England A against Pakistan when they toured England. But from 1982, he was county captain, and Worcestershire achieved considerable success under his leadership in the late 1980s. The county won the Sunday League in 1987 and 1988 and the County Championship in 1988 and 1989.

Neale's captaincy and contacts were a factor in attracting big name cricketers to Worcester. He played soccer professionally at Scunthorpe United with the England all-rounder Ian Botham, and when Botham fell out with Somerset, he joined Worcestershire. Botham was followed by a fellow England player, the fast bowler Graham Dilley, and Worcestershire also took on the Zimbabwean Graeme Hick, who later qualified for England. Neale's success in drawing team performances from a side not lacking in personalities won him nomination as a Wisden Cricketer of the Year in 1989.

Following his retirement in 1992 he has been prominent as a coach and team manager at both County (Northamptonshire and Warwickshire) and national levels (England 1999-2020). In all matches, he scored more than 17,000 runs at an average of almost 36.50 runs per innings.

He announced his retirement as the England Cricket operations manager after 21 years on 1 November 2020.

References

External links
 

1954 births
Living people
Association football fullbacks
Association football midfielders
Cricketers from Scunthorpe
English cricketers
English footballers
Gloucester City A.F.C. players
Lincoln City F.C. players
Lincoln United F.C. players
Lincolnshire cricketers
Officers of the Order of the British Empire
Scunthorpe United F.C. players
Wisden Cricketers of the Year
Worcestershire cricket captains
Worcestershire cricketers